St. Pius X High School may refer to:

United States

St. Pius X Catholic High School (DeKalb County, Georgia), near Atlanta, Georgia
St. Pius X High School (Festus, Missouri)
St. Pius X Catholic High School (Kansas City, Missouri)
Pius X High School (Nebraska), Lincoln, Nebraska
St. Pius X High School (Albuquerque), New Mexico
Saint Pius X High School (Lower Pottsgrove Township, Pennsylvania)
St. Pius X High School (Houston), Texas
St. Pius X K-8 Elementary school (Reynoldsburg), Ohio

Elsewhere
St. Pius X High School in Baie Verte, Newfoundland, Canada
St. Pius X High School (Ottawa), Ontario, Canada
St. Pius X High School, Mumbai, India
St. Pius X High School (Magherafelt), Northern Ireland
Saint Pius X Catholic High School (Rotherham), England

See also 
 St. Pius X Church (disambiguation)